In mathematics, a G-measure is a measure  that can be represented as the weak-∗ limit of a sequence of measurable functions . A classic example is the Riesz product

  

where . The weak-∗ limit of this product is a measure on the circle , in the sense that for :

 

where  represents Haar measure.

History
It was Keane who first showed that Riesz products  can be regarded as strong mixing invariant measure under the shift operator . These were later generalized by Brown and Dooley  to Riesz products of the form

  

where .

References

External links
 Riesz Product at Encyclopedia of Mathematics

Measures (measure theory)
Dimension theory